The 1980 United States elections were held on Tuesday, November 4. Republican presidential nominee Ronald Reagan defeated incumbent Democratic President Jimmy Carter. Republicans also won control of the Senate, though Democrats retained a majority in the House of Representatives. The election is sometimes referred to as part of the "Reagan Revolution", a conservative realignment in U.S. politics, and marked the start of the Reagan Era.

Reagan defeated George H. W. Bush and other candidates in the 1980 Republican presidential primaries, while Carter fended off a challenge from Senator Ted Kennedy in the 1980 Democratic primaries. In the general election, Reagan won 489 of 538 electoral votes and 50.7 percent of the popular vote, while Carter won 41.0 percent of the popular vote and independent candidate John B. Anderson took 6.6 percent of the vote.
 
Republicans picked up twelve Senate seats to take control of a chamber of Congress for the first time since the 1954 elections. They picked up 34 seats in the House, but Democrats retained a comfortable majority in that chamber. In the gubernatorial elections, Republicans won a net gain of four seats. This was the first presidential election since 1968 that the winning candidate had coattails in the House and Senate. This was the last election until 2020, when a chamber of Congress changed hands in a presidential election, and the first since 1952. 

This is the only time since 1889 that a newly elected president's party controlled only one house of Congress.

Issues

Domestic issues
The United States in the 1970s underwent "stagflation"—a wrenching period of low economic growth, high inflation and high interest rates and intermittent energy crises. These issues played a large role in the 1980 campaign.

While during Barry Goldwater's 1964 campaign, many voters saw his warnings about a too-powerful government as hyperbolic and only 30% of the electorate agreed that government was too powerful, by 1980 a majority of Americans believed that government held too much power.

Foreign issues
Events such as the Iran hostage crisis and the Soviet Invasion of Afghanistan played a large role in the 1980 elections. America was perceived by many to be weakening as a world power while the Soviet Union was perceived to be strengthening and expanding.

At the time, 60% of Americans polled felt that United States defense spending was too low.

Federal elections

Presidential election

Republican Ronald Reagan won the election in a landslide, receiving 489 electoral votes, defeating incumbent Democrat Jimmy Carter, who received 49. Reagan received the highest number of electoral votes ever won by a non-incumbent presidential candidate.

Republican Congressman John B. Anderson, who ran as an independent, received 6.6% of the vote.

Congressional elections

Senate elections

The 34 seats of Class III of the United States Senate were up for election. Republicans won majority control of the Senate for the first time in 26 years, picking up 12 seats and losing none.

House of Representatives elections

Elections were held for all 435 seats in the United States House of Representatives. Though Democrats won the nationwide popular vote by 2.6 percentage points, Republicans gained 34 seats. Nonetheless, Democrats retained a majority with 243 seats, compared to 193 seats held by Republicans.

State/territorial elections

Gubernatorial elections

Thirteen of the fifty state governorships were up for election. Four state governorships changed hands from Democrat to Republican.

The territorial governorships of American Samoa and Puerto Rico were also up for election.

See also
Reagan era
Reagan coalition
Reagan's coattails
Boll weevil (politics)

References

External links

 
1980
November 1980 events in the United States